Terry Tim Mendenhall (born April 16, 1949) is a former American football linebacker. He played for the Oakland Raiders from 1971 to 1972.

References

1949 births
Living people
American football linebackers
San Diego State Aztecs football players
Oakland Raiders players
Players of American football from Los Angeles